New to This Town is the second solo studio album by American country music artist Kix Brooks. It was released on September 11, 2012, via Arista Nashville. It is Brooks' first album after his split as one half of Brooks & Dunn. Brooks produced the album and co-wrote nine of its twelve tracks. Its first single, the title track, features Joe Walsh on guitar and was co-produced by Jay DeMarcus, one third of Rascal Flatts.  This album was followed by the soundtrack to Brooks' film Ambush at Dark Canyon, for which he composed most of the musical score and also starred in.

Track listing

Personnel

 Eli Beaird – bass guitar
 Larry Beaird – acoustic guitar
 Kix Brooks – lead vocals
 Jim "Moose" Brown – piano
 Dennis Burnside – keyboards
 Mark Casstevens – acoustic guitar
 Perry Coleman – background vocals
 J.T. Corenflos – electric guitar
 Chad Cromwell – drums
 Howard Duck – piano, Wurlitzer
 Dan Dugmore – steel guitar
 Kenny Greenberg – electric guitar
 Rob Hajacos – fiddle
 Mark Hill – bass guitar
 John Barlow Jarvis – piano
 Troy Lancaster – electric guitar
 Greg Morrow – drums
 Gary Morse – steel guitar
 Dan Needham – drums
 Kim Parent – background vocals
 Michael Rhodes – bass guitar
 Tania Smith – organ
 Russell Terrell – background vocals
 Ilya Toshinsky – acoustic guitar
 Joe Walsh – slide guitar on "New to This Town"
 Scott Williamson – drums
 Lonnie Wilson – drums
 Jonathan Yudkin – fiddle, dobro, bouzouki, acoustic guitar, harmonica, mandolin

Chart performance

Album

Singles

References

2012 albums
Kix Brooks albums
Arista Records albums
Albums produced by Jay DeMarcus